Michael Horton (born September 5, 1952) is an American actor and voice over artist whose best known and longest-running role was as Jessica Fletcher's nephew Grady Fletcher on Murder, She Wrote.

Career
Horton appeared in such films and television series as Murder, She Wrote, Star Trek: Voyager, ER, Dances with Wolves, Taxi, M*A*S*H, 21 Jump Street, Baywatch, and The Eddie Capra Mysteries. He played the recurring role of Enterprise Security Chief Lt. Daniels in Star Trek: First Contact (1996) and Star Trek: Insurrection (1998), credited as Security Officer in the former and Lieutenant Daniels in the latter.

His voiceover work in 1980s animation includes Rick Jones in The Incredible Hulk, Chip Chase in The Transformers, Hollywood stuntman Jeff Wright and Stormer's brother Craig Phillips on Jem, the younger brother Tommy Talltree of Airborne in the G.I. Joe episode "Operation Mind Menace", and Arn in The Legend of Prince Valiant. Horton also voiced The Prince in the 1993 animated film, Happily Ever After. His last credited acting role was in an episode of Judging Amy as Principal Alvin Harvey in 2002.

Horton is also a producer, director, and editor. He is co-host of the podcast Digital Production Buzz, and a founder of the Los Angeles Final Cut Pro User Group.

Personal life
Horton is married to actress Debbie Zipp, who played Horton's onscreen girlfriend and wife Donna Mayberry in Murder, She Wrote, and whose last known acting role was in the television series Gilmore Girls in two episodes (one in 2005 and one in 2007) as Katherine. The couple have two children.

Partial filmography

Films
The Lords of Discipline (1983) – Bobby Bentley
Like Father Like Son (1987) – Dr. Mike O'Donald
Happily Ever After (1989) – The Prince (voice)
Dances with Wolves (1990) – Captain Cargill – extended version
Star Trek: First Contact (1996) – Security Officer
The Beautician and the Beast (1997) – Fairytale Prince (voice)
Star Trek: Insurrection (1998) – Lt. Daniels
California Myth (1999) – Cop
The Learning Curve (1999) – Councilman Nolan

Television
M*A*S*H (1983) – Lt. Curt Collins
Columbo The conspirators (1978) – Kerry Malone
Taxi (1978–1983) – Steven Jensen
Hill Street Blues (1981–1987) – Nicky Kasner
The Incredible Hulk (1982–1983) – Rick Jones / Jonah / Beta Leader (voice)
Remington Steele (1982–1987) – Wally Donovan
Murder, She Wrote (1984–1995) – Grady Fletcher
The Transformers (1984–1987) – Teenager at Discotheque / Chip Chase (voice)
Mr. Belvedere (1985–1990) – Perry
L.A. Law (1986–1994) – Tom Locklin
21 Jump Street (1987–1991) – Brent Styles
Kissyfur (1986–1990) – Additional Voices
Lazer Tag Academy (1986) – Additional Voices
Freddy's Nightmares (1988–1990) – Doug Wodehouse
In the Heat of the Night (1988–1995) – Jody Ware
Baywatch (1989–2001) – Tony
Zazoo U (1990–1991) – Boink (voice)
The Legend of Prince Valiant (1991–1993) – Arn (voice)
ER (1994–2009) – Tom Angevine
Spider-Man (1994–1998) – Additional Voices / John Jameson (voice)
Star Trek: Voyager (1995–2001) – Kovin
Pacific Palisades (1997) – Richard Hughes
Extreme Ghostbusters (1997) – Additional Voices
The Brothers Flub (1999–2000) – Additional Voices
Titans (2000–2001) – Ted

References

External links
 
 Digital Productions Buzz Website
 Michael Horton Article at OSXFAQ website
 Los Angeles Final Cut Pro Users' Guide Website (founded by Horton)

1952 births
20th-century American male actors
American male film actors
American male television actors
American male voice actors
Living people
Place of birth missing (living people)